Béni Abbès Airport  is a public use airport located  east of Béni Abbès, a city in the Béchar Province of Algeria. The sand runway and ramp were paved sometime after 2007.

The Beni Abbes VOR-DME (Ident: BBS) and non-directional beacon (Ident: BBS) are located on the field.

See also

Transport in Algeria
List of airports in Algeria

References 

 Google Earth Historical Image - Béni Abbès

External links 
OpenStreetMap - Béni Abbès Airport
SkyVector - Beni Abbes

Airports in Algeria
Buildings and structures in Béchar Province